Úrsula Prats (born July 26, 1959), is a Mexican actress. She is the best known for playing Jacqueline Moncada de Lerdo de Tejada in Un gancho al corazón, and Luisa Duran in Tormenta en el paraíso recently. Some internet portals credit her as Ursula Pratts.

Biography
Úrsula Prats began her career in the soap opera Secretos de confesión, one of her most memorable roles was Maura in the soap opera Tú o nadie with Lucía Méndez. The actress began her career when she was invited to conduct a variety show, she gave publicity to the artists. Later on, Ernesto Alonso saw her and offered her first role.

"I loved making Monte calvario with Edith González, acting alongside Jacqueline Andere in Quiéreme siempre, that soap opera gave me a lot of satisfactions as an actress", said Úrsula.

In the soap opera Un gancho al corazón she shared credit with Otto Sirgo, Sebastián Rulli, and Ana Martín. In 2009 she worked in the soap opera Mi Pecado playing the role of Matilda - aunt of the villain Lorena.

Filmography

References 

Living people
Mexican film actresses
1959 births
Place of birth missing (living people)
Mexican television actresses
Mexican people of Catalan descent
Mexican people of German descent